The Edward Samuel Wildy Barn is a historic barn at 1198 South Arkansas Highway 136 in rural Etowah, Arkansas.  Built in 1915, it is a well-preserved example of a gambrel-roofed barn in Etowah, representative of agricultural practices of the early 20th century in Mississippi County.  It is a rectangular structure, with a central component that is gambrel-roofed, and shed-roofed wings on the sides.  The complex it stands in, built in 1915 by Edward Samuel Wildy, also includes from that period a windmill, silo, and concrete pads and troughs.

The barn was listed on the National Register of Historic Places in 2004.

See also
National Register of Historic Places listings in Mississippi County, Arkansas

References

Barns on the National Register of Historic Places in Arkansas
Buildings and structures completed in 1915
National Register of Historic Places in Mississippi County, Arkansas
1915 establishments in Arkansas
2015 disestablishments in Arkansas
Former buildings and structures in Arkansas